"Eye of the Tiger" is a song by American rock band Survivor. It was released as a single from their third album of the same name and was also the theme song for the 1982 film Rocky III, which was released a day before the single. The song was written by Survivor guitarist Frankie Sullivan and keyboardist Jim Peterik, and it was recorded at the request of Rocky III star, writer, and director Sylvester Stallone, after Queen denied him permission to use "Another One Bites the Dust", the song Stallone intended as the Rocky III theme. The version of the song that appears in the film is the demo version of the song. The film version also contained tiger growls, which did not appear on the album version. It features original Survivor singer Dave Bickler on lead vocals. The song is also the title song to the 1986 film of the same name. "Eye of the Tiger" is written in the key of C minor.

It gained tremendous MTV and radio airplay and topped charts worldwide during 1982. In the United States, it held No. 1 on the Billboard Hot 100 chart for six consecutive weeks (the band's only song to top the chart) and was the No. 2 single of 1982, behind Olivia Newton-John's "Physical". It spent fifteen consecutive weeks in the top ten, the second-longest run of 1982, behind "Hurts So Good" by John Mellencamp (which was prevented from reaching the top of the Hot 100 by "Eye of the Tiger"). This top ten run is tied with the aforementioned "Another One Bites the Dust" as well as "Physical" as the longest run in the top ten for a number one song during the entire 1980s decade. The band won an award for "Best Rock Performance by Duo or Group with Vocal" at the 25th Annual Grammy Awards. In September 1982, it also peaked at No. 1 in the United Kingdom, remaining at the top of the UK Singles Chart for four consecutive weeks. The single sold 956,000 copies in United Kingdom in 1982.

It was certified platinum in August 1982 by the RIAA, signifying sales of 2 million vinyl copies. The song had sold over 4.1 million in digital downloads in the United States alone by February 2015. It was voted VH1's 63rd-greatest hard rock song.

Background
In an interview with Songfacts, co-writer Jim Peterik, who shared writing credit with Frankie Sullivan, explained the song's title.

At first, we wondered if calling it "Eye of the Tiger" was too obvious. The initial draft of the song, we started with "It's the eye of the tiger, it's the thrill of the fight, rising up to the spirit of our rival, and the last known survivor stalks his prey in the night, and it all comes down to survival." We were going to call the song "Survival". In the rhyme scheme, you can tell we had set up "rival" to rhyme with "survival". At the end of the day, we said, "Are we nuts?" That hook is so strong, and "rival" doesn't have to be a perfect rhyme with the word "tiger". We made the right choice and went with "Eye of the Tiger".

Accolades
The song was nominated for the 1982 Academy Award for Best Original Song (the only Oscar nomination for Rocky III), but it lost to "Up Where We Belong" from An Officer and a Gentleman.

The band won an award for "Best Rock Performance by Duo or Group with Vocal" at the 25th Annual Grammy Awards. The song was also nominated for the 1983 Grammy Award for Song of the Year, but lost to the Willie Nelson hit "Always on My Mind".

Lawsuits

Newt Gingrich campaign
In 2012, Survivor sued Republican presidential candidate Newt Gingrich in Illinois federal court for using "Eye of the Tiger" without authorization as entrance music at his political rallies going back as far as 2009. The suit was later settled out of court.

Mitt Romney campaign
The same year Sullivan also demanded that Mitt Romney, also a Republican candidate for president, should stop using "Eye of the Tiger" at his campaign rallies. Romney agreed to drop the song from the campaign's playlists.

Mike Huckabee's campaign
Frankie Sullivan's company Rude Music filed a lawsuit in federal court in Chicago, Illinois, on November 18, 2015, against the former Governor of Arkansas and Republican presidential candidate Mike Huckabee's campaign organization for using "Eye of the Tiger" at a political rally without permission. The rally took place on September 8, 2015, when Kim Davis, a Kentucky county clerk, was released from jail after spending five days there for refusing to issue marriage licenses to same-sex couples in Kentucky. In June 2016 it was reported by CNN that Huckabee had agreed, in a confidential, out-of-court settlement with Sullivan's Rude Music, to pay $25,000 in compensation.

Credits and personnel
Credits adapted from the album Eye of the Tiger.
Dave Bickler – lead vocals
Frankie Sullivan – lead and rhythm guitars
Jim Peterik – grand piano, electric guitar
Stephan Ellis – bass
Marc Droubay – drums

Charts

Weekly charts

Year-end charts

All-time charts

Certifications

See also

List of number-one singles in Australia during the 1980s
List of Top 25 singles for 1982 in Australia
List of Billboard Hot 100 number-one singles of 1982
List of Billboard Mainstream Rock number-one songs of the 1980s
List of Cash Box Top 100 number-one singles of 1982
List of number-one singles of 1982 (Canada)
List of number-one singles of 1982 (Ireland)
List of number-one songs in Norway
List of UK Singles Chart number ones of the 1980s

References

External links

1982 songs
1982 singles
1995 singles
EMI Records singles
Film theme songs
Survivor (band) songs
Songs from Rocky (film series)
Songs written by Frankie Sullivan
Songs written by Jim Peterik
Billboard Hot 100 number-one singles
Cashbox number-one singles
Number-one singles in Australia
European Hot 100 Singles number-one singles
UK Singles Chart number-one singles
Irish Singles Chart number-one singles
Number-one singles in Finland
Number-one singles in Norway
Number-one singles in South Africa
Oricon International Singles Chart number-one singles
RPM Top Singles number-one singles
Scotti Brothers Records singles
Boxing music